Bossi is a surname native to the Lombardy region of Italy, particularly in Milan. Variations include Bosio and Boselli, the former being among the original derivations of "Bossi" and the latter being a common variation of Italian names. Bossy and Bossie are two etymologically related forms found in French-speaking regions as well as in the United States. The coat of arms and family standard are of a bovine bull holding the Latin phrase "In Domino Confido", which translates as "In God I trust". The bull is quartered in the solid gules (red) and argent (white) colors of the House of Savoy, set upon an azure field.

Etymologically, the name appears to be derived from two possible words. Boxwood—a prized wood historically used for landscaping or crafting—is Bosso (singular) or Bossi (plural) in Italian.  Alternately, the name may also be derived from the plural of the genus Bos, which consists of both wild and domestic cattle.  This possible relationship is reinforced by the bull on the coat of arms and family standard.

The surname can refer to the following people:
 Annalisa Bossi, born Anneliese Ullstein (1915-2015), Italian female tennis player
 Benigno Bossi (1727–1792), Italian engraver, painter, and stucco artist
 Carmelo Bossi (1939–2014), Italian boxer

 Costante Adolfo Bossi (1876–1953), Italian organist for the Milan Cathedral
 David N. Bossie (born 1965), American, President of Citizens United
 Elia Bossi (born 1994), Italian male volleyball player
 Emilio Bossi (1870-1920), Swiss freethinker, journalist, lawyer and writer
 Enea Bossi Sr. (1888–1963), Italian-American inventor and aviation pioneer
 Erma Bossi (1875-1952), German Expressionist painter
 Francesco Bossi (1525–1583), Roman Catholic prelate who served as Bishop of Novara, Perugia and Gravina
 Friedrich (Fritz) Bossi (1896–date of death unknown), Swiss cyclist, competitor at the 1924 Olympics
 Giuseppe Bossi (1777–1815), Italian painter, writer, collector, and administrator of art
 Guglielmo Bossi (1901–date of death unknown), Italian cyclist
 Henri Bossi (born 1958), retired Luxembourgian footballer and later manager
 Johann Dominik Bossi, also known as Domenico Bossi (1767–1853), Italian painter
 Joseph Aurèle de Bossi (1758–1824), French politician and poet
 Joseph Bossi or Giuseppe Bossi (1911-date of death unknown), Swiss footballer
 Joseph Tipton Bossi, American Navy Reserve pilot
 Luigi Maria Bossi (1859–1919), Italian gynecologist and  politician
 Marcel Bossi (born 1960), retired Luxembourgian football defender
 Marco Enrico Bossi (1861–1925), Italian organist and composer
 Mario Bossi (footballer, born 1909), Italian footballer 
 Maurice Bossy (1929–2008), Canadian politician
 Maxime Bossis (born 1955), French football player
 Michael Dean Bossy (born 1957), Canadian ice hockey player
 Paul Bossi (1991), Luxembourgian professional football player
 Pietro Bossi, Italian marble craftsman in Dublin between 1785 and 1798, specialising in the scagliola technique

 Renzo Bossi (born 1988), Italian politician and son of Umberto Bossi
 Rolf Bossi (1923–2015), German criminal defense lawyer
 Roy Bossi (1894-1964), Australian rugby league footballer
 Umberto Bossi (born 1941), Italian politician, as well as founder and former leader of Lega Nord
 Villi Bossi (1939), Italian sculptor

See also
 Bossi (disambiguation)

References 

Italian-language surnames